Shimon Wincelberg (26 September 1924 – 29 September 2004) was a television writer and Broadway playwright. He wrote the 1959 Broadway play Kataki starring Sessue Hayakawa and Ben Piazza.

Early life 
Wincelberg was born in Kiel, Germany. His family fled Nazi Germany, arriving in the United States in the late 1930s.

Career 
Wincelberg began his career as a writer in 1953 when he sold his first short story. He continued to write stories for a variety of publications including Harper's Bazaar, The New Yorker, and Punch. He wrote many plays, including the Broadway play Kataki, which was based on his own experience in Army intelligence during World War II. He wrote another play in 1962 called  Windows of Heaven which premiered at Stockholm's Royal Dramatic Theater. He also wrote books, some with his wife Anita, who was also a writer. He also wrote many television shows during the 1960s and 1970s, often using pseudonyms such as "Simon Wincelberg", "Simon Winvelberg", "S. Bar-David", and "Shimon Bar-David", meaning "Shimon son of David" in Hebrew. He invented the Vulcan Mindmeld in the script for "Dagger of the Mind", which aired during the first season of Star Trek.

Jewish identity 
Wincelberg was a mentor for Orthodox Jews working in Hollywood. His scripts often included Jewish themes, and depicted Jewish rituals and Jewish religious law with accuracy.

Filmography
He wrote or co-wrote over 100 scripts for episodes of the following television series:

Films

Television

Death 
Wincelberg died on 19 September 2004 of an undisclosed illness in a nursing home in Los Angeles at the age of 80.

References

External links
 

1924 births
2004 deaths
American people of German-Jewish descent
American television writers
American male television writers
German Orthodox Jews
20th-century German male writers
20th-century American male writers
20th-century American screenwriters
German emigrants to the United States